Ağaçdibi is a village in the central district of Hakkâri Province in Turkey. The village is populated by Kurds of the Jirkî tribe and had a population of 508 in 2022.

Population 
Population history from 2000 to 2022:

References 

Kurdish settlements in Hakkâri Province
Villages in Hakkâri District